The International Communication Association (ICA) is an academic association for scholars interested in the study, teaching and application of all aspects of human and mediated communication.

ICA communicates within the association and with others interested in the field through various channels. The association publishes six major, peer-reviewed journals: Journal of Communication; Communication Theory; Human Communication Research; the Journal of Computer-Mediated Communication; Communication, Culture, and Critique; the Annals of the International Communication Association. Members receive a monthly electronic newsletter. ICA holds an annual conference at which hundreds of research papers are presented and over 2,000 scholars from all over the world participate. ICA recognizes outstanding contributions to the field through awards and fellowship programs.

History
ICA was founded on January 1, 1950, in Austin, Texas, as the National Society for the Study of Communication (NSSC), a subsidiary organization of the Speech Association of America (now the (United States) National Communication Association), when the SSA determined to exclude basic communication studies from its primary focus on rhetoric. The following year, NSSC published the first issue of its official journal, Journal of Communication.

In 1967, the NSSC formally separated from the SSA and opened its membership to scholars outside of the U.S.  It changed its name two years later to the International Communication Association. The association restructured into divisions to allow members to find and interact with colleagues who shared similar research interests, among the widely diverse disciplines of communication study.

ICA relocated its offices from Austin, TX to Washington, D.C. in 2001. The association purchased a permanent headquarters in Washington in 2006.

Governance
ICA is governed by a Board of Directors, consisting of:

 the Executive Committee – President, Presidents-Elect and -Elect Select, the three immediate past Presidents – the least recent of whom serves as Finance Chair – and the executive director.
 Five Board Members-at-Large, representing five international regions as defined by UNESCO: the Americas; Europe; East Asia; West & South Asia; and Africa-Oceania.
 Two graduate student representatives.
 The chairs of ICA's Divisions and Interest Groups (although Interest Group representatives do not have voting rights).

The officers (except for the executive director) are elected by the association's members. The balloting for president and regional Members-at-Large is association-wide; student representatives are elected by ICA's student members, while Division and Interest Group chairs are chosen by the Division/Interest Group members. Terms of office begin and end at the conclusion of each year's annual ICA conference.

The president of ICA serves a one-year term; however, the Executive Committee's makeup of incoming and past presidents means that election as ICA president brings with it a six-year commitment to serve on the executive committee.

ICA maintains a series of standing and awards committees to conduct its business in relation to membership, internationalization, publications, liaison with other agencies, etc., annual awards, and ad hoc task forces. Committee members are appointed by the president.

The association is administered by the five-member staff at ICA's offices in Washington, D.C. The staff is led by the executive director, a position held since 2016 by Laura Sawyer.

Divisions and Interest Groups
ICA's members are drawn from several disciplines, focuses, and approaches to the communication discipline. Its membership is thus organized into Divisions and Interest Groups that gather scholars and students of common research interests into formal structures within the association.

New "Interest Groups" are formed when a group of 30 or more active members of the association may petition the executive director to establish an Interest Group. An interest group appoints its own officers, is allocated conference sessions, and is represented in the Board of Directors, but does not have voting rights.

An interest group enrolling at least 1 percent of the members of ICA for at least two consecutive years may apply to become a "Division". A division also appoints its own offices, and is allocated conference sessions, but unlike Interest Groups, Divisions are granted voting status on the board of directors.

Conference
ICA sponsors a large annual conference for its members to present research representing the latest advances in the field of communication. The conference is held in a different city each year, with every fourth year's conference located outside of North America.

Each year's conference has a theme, around which the conference planners organize discussion panels designed to integrate and promote discovery, learning, and engagement as panelists and audience members from different regions of the world take up the conversation on particular topics. The conference also includes annual plenary sessions featuring panels or keynote speakers. One of the plenaries is the Interactive Paper Session, in which participants display their work in the form of visual poster presentations and are awarded based on both the merit of their research and the visual quality of their presentations.

In addition, each of ICA's Divisions and Interest Groups organizes presentations and panels that explore the advancements within those Divisions' research focuses. These sessions often examine the conference theme from the aspects of the Divisions/Interest Groups.

ICA's President-Elect is head of the planning committee for the conference immediately following his/her election, and acts as the chair of that conference.

Publications
The International Communication Association's publishing partner is currently Oxford University Press.

Journals
ICA currently publishes six scholarly journals:

 Journal of Communication
 Human Communication Research
 Communication Theory
 Communication, Culture & Critique
 Journal of Computer-Mediated Communication
 Annals of the International Communication Association (currently in partnership with Taylor & Francis)

Book series
 Handbook Series: The International Communication Association Handbook Series is a series of scholarly handbooks that represent the interests of ICA members and help to further the association's goals of promoting theory and research in the communication discipline. 
Encyclopedia Series: The Wiley Blackwell-ICA International Encyclopedias of Communication is a series of multi-volume A–Z encyclopedias that span major areas of communication studies and its sub-fields, and feature the latest research from hundreds of leading scholars across the globe. 
 Annual Conference Theme Book Series, an annual selection of papers from the theme sessions of that year's ICA Annual Conference.

Newsletter
ICA publishes the web-based monthly ICA Newsletter for its members, providing news and updates on the business of the association as well as calls for papers, and other content related to the discipline in general and ICA in specific.

Fellows
ICA fellows include Charles Berger, Jennings Bryant, Patrice Buzzanell, Robert T. Craig, Brenda Dervin, Nicole Ellison, Lawrence Grossberg, Klaus Krippendorff, Kathleen Hall Jamieson, Sonia Livingstone, Joseph Walther, and Patti Valkenburg.

See also
Communication studies
Association for Education in Journalism and Mass Communication
Central States Communication Association
National Communication Association
European Communication Research and Education Association
Center for Intercultural Dialogue

References

External links
International Communication Association

Communications and media organizations based in the United States
Organizations established in 1950
Professional associations based in the United States
International educational organizations
1950 establishments in Texas
Organizations based in Washington, D.C.